Oreodera aerumnosa is a species of beetle in the family Cerambycidae. It was described by Wilhelm Ferdinand Erichson in 1847.

References

Oreodera
Beetles described in 1847